Bardayal "Lofty" Nadjamerrek  (–2009) was a Kunwinjku Aboriginal artist of the Mok clan. He belonged to the Duwa moiety and spoke the Kundedjnjenghmi language. He is currently referred to by his skin and clan as "Wamud Namok", following the Kunwinjku custom of avoiding use of the name of deceased persons.

Nadjamerrek was made an Officer of the Order of Australia (AO) in the 2004 Australia Day Honours for "service to the preservation of Indigenous culture as a Senior Traditional man and significant artist whose work documents the relationship of the land and its ancestral past via the Mimih Spirits of rock art".

Collections 

Artbank, Sydney
Australian Museum, Sydney
Aboriginal Arts Board of the Australia Council, held by the National Museum of Australia in Canberra
Berndt Museum of Anthropology, University of Western Australia
Kluge-Ruhe Aboriginal Art Collection, University of Virginia
Museum and Art Gallery of the Northern Territory, Darwin
Museum of Contemporary Art, Arnotts Collection, Sydney
National Gallery of Australia, Canberra
National Gallery of Victoria, Melbourne
The Holmes a Court Collection, Perth
University of Queensland

References

External links 
nadjamerrek.mca.com.au

1920s births
2009 deaths
Australian Aboriginal artists
Artists from the Northern Territory
20th-century Australian painters
Officers of the Order of Australia